The 1956–57 Duke Blue Devils men's basketball team represented Duke University in the 1956-57 NCAA Division I men's basketball season. The head coach was Harold Bradley and the team finished the season with an overall record of 13–11.

References 

Duke Blue Devils men's basketball seasons
Duke
1956 in sports in North Carolina
1957 in sports in North Carolina